Archimandrite Alexios of Xenophontos (born Apostolos Mantziris) is a Greek Orthodox archimandrite and Abbot of Xenophontos Monastery at Mount Athos.

Biography
Since 1976, he has served as the hegumen (abbot) of Xenophontos Monastery at Mount Athos.

In 1976, Alexios came to Xenophontos with 17 of his monks from the Monastery of Great Meteoron, of which he had been the abbot from 1973 to 1976. He continues to lead the monastery as of 2019.

In 2019, he took part in the enthronement of the head of the Orthodox Church of Ukraine, Metropolitan Epiphanius I of Ukraine.

References

Living people
1939 births
Athonite Fathers
Eastern Orthodox monks
Archimandrites
People associated with Xenophontos Monastery